The term molecular recognition refers to the specific interaction between two or more molecules through noncovalent bonding such as  hydrogen bonding, metal coordination, hydrophobic forces, van der Waals forces, π-π interactions, halogen bonding, or resonant interaction 
effects. In addition to these direct interactions, solvents can play a dominant indirect role in driving molecular recognition in solution. The host and guest involved in molecular recognition exhibit molecular complementarity. Exceptions are molecular containers, including e.g. nanotubes, in which portals essentially control selectivity.

Biological systems

Molecular recognition plays an important role in biological systems and is observed in between receptor-ligand, antigen-antibody, DNA-protein, sugar-lectin, RNA-ribosome, etc. An important example of molecular recognition is the antibiotic vancomycin that selectively binds with the peptides with terminal D-alanyl-D-alanine in bacterial cells through five hydrogen bonds. The vancomycin is lethal to the bacteria since once it has bound to these particular peptides they are unable to be used to construct the bacteria's cell wall.

Synthetic molecular recognition 
Recent work suggests that molecular recognition elements can be synthetically produced at the nano-scale, circumventing the need for naturally occurring molecular recognition elements for the development of sensing tools for small molecules. Bio-mimetic polymers such as molecular imprinted polymers and peptoids can be used to recognize larger biological targets such as proteins  and the conjugation of polymers to synthetic fluorescent nanomaterials can generate synthetic macromolecular structures that serve as synthetic antibodies for optical protein recognition and detection.

Supramolecular systems 
Chemists have demonstrated that many artificial supramolecular systems can be designed that exhibit molecular recognition.  One of the earliest examples of such a system are crown ethers which are capable of selectively binding specific cations. However, a number of artificial systems have since been established.

Static vs. dynamic
Molecular recognition can be subdivided into static molecular recognition and dynamic molecular recognition. Static molecular recognition is likened to the interaction between a key and a keyhole; it is a 1:1 type complexation reaction between a host molecule and a guest molecule to form a host–guest complex. To achieve advanced static molecular recognition, it is necessary to make recognition sites that are specific for guest molecules.

In the case of dynamic molecular recognition the binding of the first guest to the first binding site of a host affects the association constant of a second guest with a second binding site. leading to cooperativity of binding.  In the case of positive allosteric systems the binding of the first guest increases the association constant of the second guest. While for negative allosteric systems the binding of the first guest decreases the association constant with the second. The dynamic nature of this type of molecular recognition is particularly important since it provides a mechanism to regulate binding in biological systems.
Dynamic molecular recognition may enhance the ability to discriminate between several competing targets via the conformational proofreading mechanism. Dynamic molecular recognition is also being studied for application in highly functional chemical sensors and molecular devices

Complexity
A recent study based on molecular simulations and compliance constants describes molecular recognition as a phenomenon of organisation. Even for small molecules like carbohydrates, the recognition process can not be predicted or designed even assuming that each individual hydrogen bond's strength is exactly known. However, as Mobley et al. concluded, the accurate prediction of the molecular recognition events needs to go beyond the static snapshot of a single frame between the guest and the host. Entropies are key contributors to binding thermodynamics and need to be accounted for in order to predict more accurately the recognition process. Entropies are rarely observable in single bound structures (static snapshot). In proteins, highly-specific recognition can be achieved by evolutionary fine-tuning of chemical interactions, conformational changes, and entropy contributions.

Intragenic complementation

Jehle pointed out that, when immersed in a liquid and intermingled with other molecules, charge fluctuation forces favor the association of identical molecules as nearest neighbors.  In accord with this principle, the multiple copies of a polypeptide encoded by a gene often undergo molecular recognition with each other to form an ordered multi-polypeptide protein structure.  When such a protein is formed from polypeptides produced by two different mutant alleles of a particular gene, the protein composed of a mixture of polypeptides may exhibit greater functional activity than the multi-polypeptide protein formed by each of the mutants alone.  In such a case, the phenomenon is referred to as intragenic complementation.

Intragenic complementation (also called inter-allelic complementation) has been demonstrated in many different genes in a variety of organisms. Crick and Orgel analyzed of the results of such studies and came to the conclusion that intragenic complementation, in general, arises from the interaction of differently defective polypeptide monomers when they form an ordered aggregate they called a “multimer.”

See also 
Journal of Molecular Recognition
SAMPL Challenge
Noncovalent interactions
Supramolecular chemistry
Allostery
Cooperativity
Molecular assembler

References

External links 
 

Supramolecular chemistry